The Esslinger Building, at 31866 Camino Capistrano in San Juan Capistrano, California, was built in 1938.  It was listed on the National Register of Historic Places in 1988.

It is a one-story streamline moderne style office building.  It was designed by the architect Alexander Law for Dr. Paul H. Esslinger to serve as a medical clinic.  A second contributing building is a garage behind, with an upstairs apartment unit, which was connected to the main building by a roof added in 1982.

References

External links

National Register of Historic Places in Orange County, California
Streamline Moderne architecture in California
Buildings and structures completed in 1938